Working Week were a British jazz-dance band active in the 1980s and 1990s.

Working Week was formed in 1983 by guitarist Simon Booth and saxophonist Larry Stabbins from the band Weekend, which ended when singer Alison Statton left to become a schoolteacher. The duo released their debut single "Venceremos (We Will Win)" during the following year. The song was a tribute to Chilean protest singer Víctor Jara, with vocals by Robert Wyatt and Tracey Thorn (the latter from the band Everything but the Girl). It became the band's highest placing in the UK Singles Chart, where it peaked at No. 64. The single included founding members of the London School of Samba, notably Bosco de Oliveira and Dawson Miller. Other early members of the group also performed with the band.

The debut album Working Nights was released in April 1985, with vocalist Juliet Roberts added as a member of the band. Roberts continued as singer on the 1986 album Compañeros and Surrender, released in 1987, but left the band after that year's single, "Knocking on Your Door". Julie Tippetts returned as vocalist for the 1989 album Fire in the Mountain, and Eyvon Waite was solo vocalist for Black and Gold (1991), the band's final studio album.

Working Week appeared on 9 February 1986 at the Royal Albert Hall in a benefit concert for victims of the 1985 Armero tragedy in Colombia.

Discography

Albums
Working Nights (Virgin Records V2343) – 1985 UK No. 23
Compañeros (Virgin Records V2397) – 1986 UK No. 72
Surrender (Virgin Records V2468) – 1987
Payday (Best of Working Week) (compilation), (Virgin Records Ltd./Venture VEGD19) – 1988, also in 1999
Pay Check (compilation, US version of 'Payday') (Venture 2–90997) – 1988
Fire in the Mountain (10 Records DIX86) – 1989
Black and Gold (10 Records DIX95) – 1991

Singles
"Venceremos (We Will Win)" – 1984 UK No. 64
"Storm of Light" – 1984 UK No. 88
"Inner City Blues" – 1985 UK No. 93
"Sweet Nothing" – 1985 UK No. 83
"Stella Marina" – 1985
"I Thought I'd Never See You Again" – 1985 UK No. 80
"Too Much Time" – 1986 UK No. 94
"South Africa" – 1986
"Rodrigo Bay" – 1986
"Don't Touch My Friend" – 1986
"Surrender" – 1987
"Largo" – 1987
"Knocking On Your Door" – 1988
"Eldorado" – 1989
"Blade" – 1989
"Testify" – 1990
"Positive" – 1991 UK No. 96
"Holding On" – 1991

References

External links
 Working Week at Last.fm
 

Musical groups established in 1983
Musical groups disestablished in 1991
English dance music groups
English jazz ensembles
British musical trios
Musical groups from London
Virgin Records artists